A flag of Vernon, British Columbia, a city in the Okanagan region of Canada, was adopted in November 2010 after it had been flown in Afghanistan by Canadian Forces members, including Gareth Eley, a seaman from the city, who returned the flag when it was adopted. It was presented to the mayor at a service member flag program, Home Flags Project, by Eley, in addition to a number of other municipal flags, in Vernon at the Wesbild Centre sports stadium during Remembrance Day ceremonies. The mayor stated it displays the "rich" history of this city to the public.

Vernon City Council declared they would frame and display the flag at Vernon City Hall at this time. There is a crest and shield version of the flag of Vernon that is used occasionally; it was adopted shortly after the city was incorporated. The flag of Vernon represents the city itself and its region, the Okanagan, containing a "V" to note Vernon, an elk to represent the wildlife of the area, sheaves to suggest the importance of agriculture in the city, while its horn of plenty notes its fruit industry.

References

External links 
 

Vernon
Flags of cities in British Columbia
Flag
Flags displaying animals